Bosko Shipwrecked! is a 1931 one-reel short subject featuring Bosko; part of the Looney Tunes series. It was released on September 19, 1931 and is directed by Hugh Harman. This is the first Looney Tunes short to only have one director (as well as the first short to not be directed or co-directed by Rudolf Ising). The film score was composed by Frank Marsales.

Plot
Bosko, the captain of a ship, is shipwrecked on a desolate island, where he is awoken by the monkeys and birds inhabiting the island. Once gaining consciousness, he is pursued by a lion and wanders into a native village, which subsequently leads to him being cornered by the inhabitants of the village.

References

External links
 

1931 films
1931 animated films
Looney Tunes shorts
Warner Bros. Cartoons animated short films
Films scored by Frank Marsales
Films about castaways
Films about survivors of seafaring accidents or incidents
Films directed by Hugh Harman
Bosko films
Films set on islands
1930s Warner Bros. animated short films